The Baxter Cup is the oldest New Zealand trophy in the sport of curling. First contested in 1884, it is thought to be the oldest still-contested New Zealand sporting trophy.

The trophy competition was initially held in Dunedin at the Dunedin Curling Club, but went into abeyance in 1895 after that club was dissolved. The competition was next held in Central Otago in 1900, and has been contested irregularly since that time. The competition is currently organised by the Naseby Curling Council as a one-day bonspiel.

The Baxter Cup was named after David Baxter, a founding member of the Dunedin Curling Club who, who donated the trophy.

The current (2017) champions are the Kyeburn Curling Club from Kyeburn, who won the final in July 2017 against Ranfurly's Mount Ida Curling Club.

References

Curling competitions in New Zealand
1884 establishments in New Zealand